Florida Elite Soccer Academy is a soccer club in St. Johns, Florida, competing in the Southeast Division of USL League Two. 

Founded in 2014 through a merger, led by Steven Mail, of two northeastern clubs in Florida, Florida Elite Soccer Academy launched as a youth program. In 2018, they announced a partnership with English Premier League club Tottenham Hotspur.

They were announced as an expansion club for USL League Two to begin play in 2019. They started their debut season with a three match home winning streak. They finished their inaugural season in 4th place in the Southeast Division.

Year-by-year

References

USL League Two teams
Association football clubs established in 2014
Soccer clubs in Florida
2014 establishments in Florida
Sports teams in Jacksonville, Florida